Michael Jerome Cooper (born April 15, 1956) is an American basketball coach and former player who is the boys varsity coach at Culver City High School.  He played for the Los Angeles Lakers in the National Basketball Association (NBA), winning five NBA championships with the Lakers during their Showtime era. He was an eight-time selection to the NBA All-Defensive Team, including five times on the first team. He was named the NBA Defensive Player of the Year in 1987.

Cooper's previous coaching jobs include leading the Los Angeles Sparks of the Women's National Basketball Association (WNBA) to two championships and the Albuquerque Thunderbirds to one NBA G League title. He has also coached in the NBA, WNBA, and the NBA Development League.

Early life
Cooper was born in Los Angeles. When he was three years old, he cut one of his knees severely, requiring 100 stitches to close. At the time the doctor said that he would never be able to walk.

College career 
Cooper attended Pasadena High School, graduating in 1974, then Pasadena City College before transferring to the University of New Mexico. He played for the New Mexico Lobos for two seasons, 1976–78, and was named first team All-Western Athletic Conference. In Cooper's senior season, he was named a first-team All-American by the United States Basketball Writers Association. The Lobos won the WAC title, with Cooper averaging 16.3 points, 5.7 rebounds, and 4.2 assists per game.

Professional career

Los Angeles Lakers (1978–1990) 
Selected by the Los Angeles Lakers in the third round of the 1978 NBA draft with the 60th overall pick, Cooper became an integral part of their Showtime teams of the 1980s with his defensive skills. In a twelve-year career, he was named to the NBA All Defensive Team eight times, including five first-team selections. Cooper and Norm Van Lier have the most defensive selections of any player to not be inducted into the Naismith Basketball Hall of Fame. He was named a finalist in 2022. He won the NBA Defensive Player of the Year Award in 1987. He, along with Kareem Abdul-Jabbar and Magic Johnson, was a member of five Lakers championship teams in 1980, 1982, 1985, 1987, and 1988.
 
At 6 ft 5 in (1.96 m), 174 lb (77 kg), the rail-thin Cooper known for his knee-high socks, played shooting guard, small forward, and point guard, although his defensive assignment was usually the other team's best shooter at the 2 or 3 position. Larry Bird has said that Cooper was the best defender he faced.  For his career, Cooper averaged 8.9 points, 4.2 assists, 3.2 rebounds, 1.2 steals, and 0.6 blocks per game. A popular player among Lakers fans, home crowds were known to chant, "Coooooooop" whenever he controlled the ball, and the Lakers sometimes ran an alley-oop play for him that was dubbed the "Coop-a-loop." Leaving the team after the 1989–90 season, he was ranked among the club's all-time top 10 in three-point field goals (428), games played (873), total minutes played (23,635), steals (1033), blocked shots (523), assists (3,666), defensive rebounds (2,028), offensive rebounds (741), and free throw percentage (.833).

Pallacanestro Virtus Roma (1990–1991) 
Cooper then played for the 1990–91 season in Italy for Pallacanestro Virtus Roma in the Italian Serie A, averaging 15.8 points, 6.1 rebounds, 1.9 steals, 1.8 assists, and 0.3 blocks per game.

Coaching career

Los Angeles Lakers (1994–1997) 
Following Cooper's playing career, he served as Special Assistant to Lakers' general manager Jerry West for three years before joining the Lakers' coaching staff in March 1994 under Magic Johnson, then with Del Harris from 1994 to 1997.

Los Angeles Sparks (1999–2004) 
Cooper became an assistant coach of the WNBA's Los Angeles Sparks in 1999, and helped the team reach the playoffs for the first time in franchise history, with a record of 20–12.

He was named the Sparks' head coach in November 1999, and the Sparks' record quickly improved, as they finished 28–4 in their 2000 campaign.  Cooper was named the WNBA Coach of the Year for his efforts. The Sparks followed with consecutive WNBA Championships in 2001 and 2002, but were denied a third straight WNBA title by losing to the Detroit Shock in 2003.

Denver Nuggets (2004–2005) 
After the Sacramento Monarchs ended the Sparks' run in the first round of the 2004 WNBA Playoffs, Cooper took a job as an assistant coach under Jeff Bzdelik with the Denver Nuggets. After 24 games, Bzedlik was fired, and Cooper was named the Nuggets' interim head coach. He remained interim head coach until George Karl was brought in to coach the team about a month later and served as a scout for the Nuggets the remainder of the season.

Albuquerque Thunderbirds (2005–2007) 
Cooper was the head coach of the Albuquerque Thunderbirds for three years (2005–07). In 2007, he left the Thunderbirds after coaching them to the National Basketball Association D-
League Championship in 2006.

Return to Sparks (2007–2009) 
Cooper then returned to coaching in the WNBA as head coach of the Los Angeles Sparks.

USC Trojans' women's basketball team (2009–2013) 
In May 2009, Cooper was named head coach of the University of Southern California's Women of Troy Basketball Team. He quit in 2013 after USC went 11–20 and finished seventh in the Pac-12 Conference with a 7–11 record. He was 72–57 overall at USC.

Atlanta Dream (2014–2017) 
In November 2013, Cooper was hired by the Atlanta Dream as head coach. His contract was not renewed by Atlanta after an 11–22 season in 2017.

Chadwick (2019–2021) 
In 2018, Cooper signed on to coach 3's Company of the Big3 League.

In 2019, Cooper was named the boys varsity coach at Chadwick School in the Palos Verdes Peninsula of Los Angeles County.

Culver City (2021–present) 
Cooper became the head coach at Culver City High School on September 8, 2021.

Head coaching record

NBA

|-
| style="text-align:left;"|Denver
| style="text-align:left;"|
|14||4||10|||| align="center"|(interim)|||—||—||—||—
| style="text-align:center;"|—
|- class="sortbottom"
| align="center" colspan="2"|Career
|14||4||10|||| ||—||—||—||—||

WNBA

|-
| style="text-align:left;"|Los Angeles
| style="text-align:left;"|2000
|32||28||4|||| align="center"|1st in Western|||4||2||2||
| style="text-align:center;"|Lost in Conference Finals
|- ! style="background:#FDE910;"
| style="text-align:left;"|Los Angeles
| style="text-align:left;"|2001
|32||28||4|||| align="center"|1st in Western|||7||6||1||
| style="text-align:center;"|Won WNBA Championship
|- ! style="background:#FDE910;"
| style="text-align:left;"|Los Angeles
| style="text-align:left;"|2002
|32||25||7|||| align="center"|1st in Western|||6||6||0||
| style="text-align:center;"|Won WNBA Championship
|- 
| style="text-align:left;"|Los Angeles
| style="text-align:left;"|2003
|34||24||10|||| align="center"|1st in Western|||9||5||4||
| style="text-align:center;"|Lost WNBA Finals
|-
|- 
| style="text-align:left;"|Los Angeles
| style="text-align:left;"|2004
|20||14||6|||| align="center"|(resigned)|||—||—||—||—
| style="text-align:center;"|—
|-
| style="text-align:left;"|Los Angeles
| style="text-align:left;"|2007
|34||10||24|||| align="center"|6th in Western|||—||—||—||—
| style="text-align:center;"|—
|-
| style="text-align:left;"|Los Angeles
| style="text-align:left;"|2008
|34||20||14|||| align="center"|3rd in Western|||6||3||3||
| style="text-align:center;"|Lost in Conference Finals
|-
| style="text-align:left;"|Los Angeles
| style="text-align:left;"|2009
|34||18||16|||| align="center"|3rd in Western|||6||3||3||
| style="text-align:center;"|Lost in Conference Finals
|-
| style="text-align:left;"|Atlanta
| style="text-align:left;"|2014
|34||19||15|||| align="center"|1st in Eastern|||3||1||2||
| style="text-align:center;"|Lost First Round
|-
| style="text-align:left;"|Atlanta
| style="text-align:left;"|2015
|34||15||19|||| align="center"|5th in Eastern|||—||—||—||—
| style="text-align:center;"|—
|-
| style="text-align:left;"|Atlanta
| style="text-align:left;"|2016
|34||17||17|||| align="center"|4th in Eastern|||2||1||1||
| style="text-align:center;"|Lost Second Round
|-
| style="text-align:left;"|Atlanta
| style="text-align:left;"|2017
|34||12||22|||| align="center"|5th in Eastern|||—||—||—||—
| style="text-align:center;"|—

|- class="sortbottom"
| align="center" colspan="2"|Career
|388||230||158|||| ||43||27||16||||

D-League

|-! style="background:#FDE910;"
| style="text-align:left;"|Albuquerque
| style="text-align:left;"|2005–06
|48||26||22|||| align="center"|2nd|||2||2||0||
| style="text-align:center;"|Won D-League Championship
|- 
| style="text-align:left;"|Albuquerque
| style="text-align:left;"|2006–07
|50||24||26|||| align="center"|3rd in Western|||1||0||1||
| style="text-align:center;"|Lost in First Round
|- class="sortbottom"
| align="center" colspan="2"|Career
|98||50||48|||| ||2||2||1||

College

NBA career statistics

Regular season 

|-
| style="text-align:left;"| 
| style="text-align:left;"|L.A. Lakers
| 3 ||  || 2.3 || .500 || ||  || 0.0 || 0.0 || 0.3 || 0.0 || 2.0
|-
| style="text-align:left;background:#afe6ba;"|†
| style="text-align:left;"|L.A. Lakers
| 82 ||  || 24.1 || .524 || .250 || .776 || 2.8 || 2.7 || 1.0 || 0.5 || 8.8
|-
| style="text-align:left;"| 
| style="text-align:left;"|L.A. Lakers
| 81 ||  || 32.4 || .491 || .211 || .785 || 4.1 || 4.1 || 1.6 || 1.0 || 9.4
|-
| style="text-align:left;background:#afe6ba;"|†
| style="text-align:left;"|L.A. Lakers
| 76 || 14 || 28.9 || .517 || .118 || .813 || 3.5 || 3.0 || 1.6 || 0.8 || 11.9
|-
| style="text-align:left;"| 
| style="text-align:left;"|L.A. Lakers
| 82 || 3 || 26.2 || .535 || .238 || .785 || 3.3 || 3.8 || 1.4 || 0.6 || 7.8
|-
| style="text-align:left;"| 
| style="text-align:left;"|L.A. Lakers
| 82 || 9 || 29.1 || .497 || .314 || .838 || 3.2 || 5.9 || 1.4 || 0.8 || 9.0
|-
| style="text-align:left;background:#afe6ba;"|†
| style="text-align:left;"|L.A. Lakers
| 82 || 20 || 26.7 || .465 || .285 || .865 || 3.1 || 5.2 || 1.1 || 0.6 || 8.6
|-
| style="text-align:left;"| 
| style="text-align:left;"|L.A. Lakers
| 82 || 15 || 27.7 || .452 || .387 || .865 || 3.0 || 5.7 || 1.1 || 0.5 || 9.2
|-
| style="text-align:left;background:#afe6ba;"|†
| style="text-align:left;"|L.A. Lakers
| 82 || 2 || 27.5 || .438 || .385 || .851 || 3.1 || 4.5 || 1.0 || 0.5 || 10.5
|-
| style="text-align:left;background:#afe6ba;"|†
| style="text-align:left;"|L.A. Lakers
| 61 || 8 || 29.4 || .392 || .320 || .858 || 3.7 || 4.7 || 1.1 || 0.4 || 8.7
|-
| style="text-align:left;"| 
| style="text-align:left;"|L.A. Lakers
| 80 || 13 || 24.3 || .431 || .381 || .871 || 2.4 || 3.9 || 0.9 || 0.4 || 7.3
|-
| style="text-align:left;"| 
| style="text-align:left;"|L.A. Lakers
| 80 || 10 || 23.1 || .387 || .318 || .883 || 2.8 || 2.7 || 0.8 || 0.5 || 6.4
|- class="sortbottom"
| style="text-align:center;" colspan="2"| Career
| 873 || 94 || 27.1 || .469 || .340 || .833 || 3.2 || 4.2 || 1.2 || 0.6 || 8.9

Playoffs 

|-
| style="text-align:left;background:#afe6ba;"|1980†
|style="text-align:left;"|L.A. Lakers
|16|| ||29.0||.407||.000||.861||3.7||3.6||1.5||0.7||9.1
|-
| style="text-align:left;|1981
|style="text-align:left;"|L.A. Lakers
|3|| ||34.0||.550||.000||.714||3.3||2.3||2.0||0.0||10.7
|-
| style="text-align:left;background:#afe6ba;"|1982†
|style="text-align:left;"|L.A. Lakers
|14|| ||27.4||.565||.500||.735||4.4||4.4||1.7||0.8||11.9
|-
| style="text-align:left;|1983
|style="text-align:left;"|L.A. Lakers
|15|| ||30.2||.465||.143||.829||3.9||2.9||1.7||0.4||9.4
|-
| style="text-align:left;|1984
|style="text-align:left;"|L.A. Lakers
|21|| ||34.4||.461||.333||.806||3.9||5.7||1.1||1.0||11.3
|-
| style="text-align:left;background:#afe6ba;"|1985†
|style="text-align:left;"|L.A. Lakers
|19|| ||26.4||.563||.308||.923||4.0||4.9||1.1||0.5||10.4
|-
| style="text-align:left;|1986
|style="text-align:left;"|L.A. Lakers
|14|| ||30.1||.470||.463||.818||3.3||4.9||1.3||0.3||9.7
|-
| style="text-align:left;background:#afe6ba;"|1987†
|style="text-align:left;"|L.A. Lakers
|18|| ||29.0||.484||.486||.852||3.3||5.0||1.4||0.8||13.0
|-
| style="text-align:left;background:#afe6ba;"|1988†
|style="text-align:left;"|L.A. Lakers
|24|| ||24.5||.412||.403||.741||2.4||2.8||0.8||0.4||6.4
|-
| style="text-align:left;|1989
|style="text-align:left;"|L.A. Lakers
|15|| ||27.6||.416||.382||.833||2.7||4.7||0.6||0.5||7.7
|-
| style="text-align:left;|1990
|style="text-align:left;"|L.A. Lakers
|9|| ||19.2||.286||.250|| ||2.7||2.8||0.8||0.4||2.6
|- class="sortbottom"
| style="text-align:center;" colspan="2"| Career
| 168 || 4 || 28.2 || .468 || .392 || .825 || 3.4 || 4.2 || 1.2 || 0.6 || 9.4

Personal life 
In July 2014, Cooper was diagnosed with early-stage tongue cancer. He had surgery at Winship Cancer Institute of Emory University in Atlanta, and was able to recuperate.

See also

 List of National Basketball Association career playoff steals leaders
 List of NBA players who have spent their entire career with one franchise

References

External links

 Coaching record at basketball-reference.com: NBA, WNBA

1956 births
Living people
20th-century African-American sportspeople
21st-century African-American people
African-American basketball coaches
African-American basketball players
All-American college men's basketball players
American expatriate basketball people in Italy
American men's basketball players
American women's basketball coaches
Atlanta Dream coaches
Basketball coaches from California
Basketball players from Los Angeles
Basketball players from Pasadena, California
Big3 coaches
Denver Nuggets assistant coaches
Denver Nuggets head coaches
Los Angeles Lakers assistant coaches
Los Angeles Lakers draft picks
Los Angeles Lakers players
Los Angeles Sparks head coaches
New Mexico Lobos men's basketball players
Pallacanestro Virtus Roma players
Pasadena City Lancers men's basketball players
Pasadena High School (California) alumni
People from View Park–Windsor Hills, California
Shooting guards
Small forwards
USC Trojans women's basketball coaches
Women's National Basketball Association championship-winning head coaches